Steve Healy is an Australian sporting administrator and lawyer. He was the President of Tennis Australia until 2017 and Vice-President of the International Tennis Federation until 2015. He was also President of the Oceania Tennis Federation and a Trustee of the Melbourne & Olympic Parks Trust.

References 

International Tennis Federation
21st-century Australian lawyers
Living people
Australian sports executives and administrators
Australian chief executives
Year of birth missing (living people)